Viktoriya Evgenievna Isakova (born 12 October 1976) is a Russian theater and film actress.  Her film credits include  Tochka (2006), The Island (2006)  and Mirrors (2013).  Her television credits include Ottepel (2013). In 2015 she starred in Rodina, the Russian TV adaptation of Homeland.

Biography
Isakova was born in Khasavyurt, Dagestan ASSR, RSFSR, USSR. At age 13 she moved with her family to Moscow.
After school she entered the Russian Academy of Theatre Arts, and after years of study transferred to the Moscow Art Theatre School in the course of Oleg Efremov. She graduated from the Moscow Art Theatre School in 1999.

In 2001, she joined the Moscow Pushkin Drama Theatre. For her performance of Pannochka in the play Viy, she won the 2003 "Seagull" Theatre Award.

Her husband is the director Yuri Moroz.

In 2006, for the role of Kira, nicknamed "Zebra", in Yuri Moroz's Tochka, Viktoriya Isakova received the award for "Best Actress of the Year" at the Chicago International Film Festival.

Filmography

References

External links

Living people
1976 births
People from Khasavyurt
Russian film actresses
Russian television actresses
Russian stage actresses
20th-century Russian actresses
21st-century Russian actresses
Moscow Art Theatre School alumni